Delovoy Tsentr may stand for one of the stations of Moscow Metro:

 Delovoy Tsentr (Kalininsko-Solntsevskaya Line)
 Delovoy Tsentr (Moscow Central Circle)
 Delovoy Tsentr (Bolshaya Koltsevaya line)
 Vystavochnaya, formerly Delovoy Tsentr.